On November 8, 1994, Washington, D.C., held an election for its mayor. It featured the return of Marion Barry, who served as mayor from 1979 until 1991.

Barry served six months in prison on a cocaine conviction.  After his release from prison, Barry ran successfully for the Ward 8 city council seat in 1992, running under the slogan "He May Not Be Perfect, But He's Perfect for D.C."  Upon this victory, Barry said he was "not interested in being mayor" again.

This was by far the smallest Democratic victory margin in a partisan citywide election since the city was granted home rule.

Campaign

Democratic primary
Sharon Pratt Kelly succeeded Barry as mayor.  In the second year of her term, Barry loyalists mounted a recall campaign, which, although unsuccessful, weakened her administration.

Councillor John Ray received the endorsement of The Washington Post and was favored to win the primary.  However, Barry ran a grassroots campaign, touting his record balancing the budget in 10 of his 12 years as mayor.

General election
A major issue in the campaign was how to cut $140 million from the city budget, as mandated by Congress.  Though Barry was seen by some as responsible for the bureaucracy
and Schwartz criticized Barry's proposals as old and ineffective, Barry tied his personal redemption to the redemption of the city.

Results

Democratic primary

Republican primary

General election

See also
Electoral history of Marion Barry

External links
https://www.nytimes.com/1994/11/09/us/1994-elections-nation-capital-barry-rebounds-disgrace-win-again-washington.html?n=Top%2FReference%2FTimes+Topics%2FPeople%2FB%2FBarry%2C+Marion+S.+Jr.

References

1994
Washington
Mayoral
Washington, D.C.